Bryan Van Mierlo, professionally known as Eestbound, is a Toronto-based Dutch record producer. He has produced songs for such artists as Travis Scott, Young Thug, Waka Flocka Flame, Lil Dicky, Young Dolph, Smoke DZA, and Sean Leon.

Production discography

Charted song

Production credits

2015 
 Travis Scott – "Antidote" from Rodeo 
 Young Thug – "Freaky" from Slime Season

2016 
 Little Simz – "Bad to the Bone" (feat. Bibi Bourelly) from Stillness in Wonderland 
 FACE – "BLAZER"

2017 
 Brain (Lil Dicky) – "Whippin’ It Up" from I'm Brain 
Young Dolph – "All of Mine" (feat. DRAM) from Thinking Out Loud 
Sean Leon – "Vintage" from C.C.W.M.T.T 
Sean Leon – "81" from I Think You've Gone Mad (Or the Sins of the Father) 
Sean Leon – "905 9TO5" from I Think You've Gone Mad (Or the Sins of the Father)

2018 
6ixBuzz – "Ah EE" (feat. K Money, Prince Dawn & Yung Tory) from 6ixupsidedown
6ixBuzz – "Don't Talk" (feat. Bizz Loc & Roney) from 6ixupsidedown 
6ixBuzz – "Porsche" (feat. Casper TNG & LB Spiffy) from 6ixupsidedown

2019 
Waka Flocka Flame – "Pumkin" (feat. Prince Ink) from Salute Me or Shoot Me 6

2020 
Smoke DZA – "Rules" (feat. Tish Hyman) from A Closed Mouth Don’t Get Fed
L'One – "Золотой актив" 
6ixBuzz – "Prayers" (feat. Spadez) from NorthernSound (Deluxe)

2021 
L'One – "Я есть пламя" from Восход 1

References

Living people
Canadian record producers
Year of birth missing (living people)